Nikolayevka is a rural locality (a selo) in Starooskolsky District, Belgorod Oblast, Russia. The population was 176 as of 2010.

References 

Rural localities in Starooskolsky District